Soalala is a rural municipality in western Madagascar. It belongs to the district of Soalala, which is a part of Boeny Region. The population of the commune was estimated to be approximately 15,000 in 2001 commune census.

Soalala is served by a local airport and maritime harbour. It also has riverine harbour. Primary and junior level secondary education are available in town. The majority 78% of the population of the commune are farmers.  The most important crop is rice, while other important products are bananas and cassava.  Industry and services provide employment for 5% and 1% of the population, respectively. Additionally fishing employs 16% of the population.

There had been several victimes of Cyclone Belna that fell land on  09.12.2019 in Soalala

Economy
Soalala mine - iron ore
Marine shrimp farming
Baie de Baly National Park
Tsingy de Namoroka Strict Nature Reserve

Infra structures
 Soalala Airport
 Thermal power station of 60 kw.
Two additional hydraulic power stations are planned to take up operations in 2021.

References and notes 

Populated places in Boeny